Le Mesnil is a commune in the Manche department in Normandy in north-western France.

It consists of a three property hamlet 1 km to the west of Barenton. The existing traditional stone properties are believed to have been built around 1830-1840 and became the centre of the cider making exploits of the nearby farms. In some decay, there is also a round capped bread oven in which, there is living memory of it being used after the Second World War (1949).

See also
Communes of the Manche department

References

Mesnil
1830 establishments in France